Yosef "Yosale" Merimovich (24 July 1924 – 5 May 2011) was a football player and manager. A one-club man, he played as a forward for Maccabi Tel Aviv between 1947 and 1958, winning six championships and six cups. Born in Cyprus, he represented the Israel national team at international level. He went on to coach both Maccabi Tel Aviv and the Israel national team on multiple occasions.

Career
Born in Margo, Cyprus, Merimovich immigrated to Israel at the age of 16. He spent his entire playing career with Maccabi Tel Aviv, winning six championships and six cups between 1947 and 1958. At international level, he made 14 appearances for the Israel national team scoring 4 goals.

After his retirement from playing, Merimovich became a coach of Maccabi Tel Aviv. He was appointed coach of Israel in 1964 and helped it win the 1964 AFC Asian Cup. He returned to Maccabi Tel Aviv winning the 1966–68 Liga Leumit. In 1982, he became Israel national team coach for a second time, leaving after the 1986 FIFA World Cup qualification campaign. He went on to coach Maccabi Tel Aviv for a third time.

Legacy
It was upon Merimovich's suggestion in 1942 that yellow was added to Maccabi Tel Aviv's existing club colours of blue and white, "as a sign of identification with the Jews of Europe".

Death
Merimovich died on 5 May 2011, at the age of 86.

Honours

As a Player
Maccabi Tel Aviv
 Israeli football championship (6): 1946–47, 1949–50, 1951–52, 1953–54, 1955–56, 1957–58
 Israel State Cup (6): 1940–41, 1945–46, 1946–47, 1953–54, 1954–55, 1957–68

As a Manager
Maccabi Tel Aviv
 Liga Leumit: 1966–68
 Israel State Cup: 1958–59
 Asian Champion Club Tournament: 1967, 1969

Israel
 AFC Asian Cup: 1964

References

External links
 
 Profile at Maccabi Tel Aviv

1924 births
2011 deaths
People from Nicosia District
Israeli footballers
Association football forwards
Israel international footballers
1956 AFC Asian Cup players
Maccabi Tel Aviv F.C. players
Israeli football managers
1964 AFC Asian Cup managers
Israel national football team managers
Maccabi Tel Aviv F.C. managers
Hapoel Tel Aviv F.C. managers
Cypriot emigrants to Israel
Cypriot people of Jewish descent
Israeli Jews